Tala is an upazila of the Satkhira District in the Khulna Division of Bangladesh.

Geography

History
Tala was established in 1913 and made an upazila in 1983.

Demographics
According to the 2011 Bangladesh census, Tala had a population of 299,820. Males constituted 49.83% of the population and females 50.17%. Muslims formed 73.46% of the population, Hindus 25.76%, Christians 0.62% and others 0.16%. Tala had a literacy rate of 50.88% for the population 7 years and above.

As of the 1991 Bangladesh census, Tala has a population of 251388. 51.31% of the population is male, and 48.69% is female.

Administration
Tala Upazila is divided into 12 union parishads: Dhandia, Islamkati, Jalalpur, Khalilnagar, Khalishkhali, Khesra, Kumira, Magura, Nagarghata, Sarulia, Tala, and Tentulia. The union parishads are subdivided into 150 mauzas and 229 villages.

Education

According to Banglapedia, Kumira Multilateral High School, founded in 1902, is a notable secondary school.

See also
 Upazilas of Bangladesh
 Districts of Bangladesh
 Divisions of Bangladesh

References

Upazilas of Satkhira District
Satkhira District
Khulna Division